The First Avenue station is a station on the BMT Canarsie Line of the New York City Subway. Located at the intersection of First Avenue and East 14th Street at the border of Stuyvesant Park, Stuyvesant Town, and the East Village in Manhattan, it is served by the L train at all times.

History
This station opened on June 30, 1924, as part of the 14th Street–Eastern Line, which ran from Sixth Avenue under the East River and through Williamsburg to Montrose and Bushwick Avenues.

In September 1983 this station was the site of the arrest of Michael Stewart, a notable case in the history of police brutality.

The station originally had entrances only at its western end, on First Avenue. Its eastern entrances at Avenue A were built as part of the wide scope in the 2019–2020 rebuilding of the Canarsie Tubes that were damaged during Hurricane Sandy, and to improve service for people living in Stuyvesant Town–Peter Cooper Village, the East Village, and Alphabet City. Work on the entrances began in July 2017, necessitating the relocation of bus stops at that intersection. The entrances to the Brooklyn-bound platform were opened on November 4, 2019. The entrance to the Eighth Avenue-bound platform was expected to be opened by the end of 2019, but the opening date was postponed to February 10, 2020. This was followed by the temporary closure of the entrances at First Avenue.

New elevators were built at the new eastern entrances and were opened on August 6, 2020. Substantial completion of the entrances was projected for November 2020.

Station layout 

This underground station has two side platforms and two tracks. It is the easternmost Canarsie Line station in Manhattan. East of here, the line travels under the East River to Williamsburg, Brooklyn. The platforms are columnless and have the standard BMT style trim-line and name tablets. The former contains "1" tablets in standard intervals while the latter consists of "FIRST AVE" in white seriffed lettering.

Exits
The station's western entrances are at the (railroad north) end of the station; from each platform, a single staircase goes up to a small mezzanine that contains a turnstile bank, token booth. Two street stairs to the Eighth Avenue-bound platform lead to the northeastern corner of First Avenue and 14th Street, while the ones to the Brooklyn-bound platform lead to the southeastern corner. The mezzanine on the Brooklyn-bound side had a florist shop outside fare control; the shop closed in 2019. There is no free transfer between directions at this station.

The station's eastern entrances are at the railroad south end of the station; there are platform-level turnstile banks from each platform. Two street stairs to the Eighth Avenue-bound platform lead to the northwestern corner of Avenue A and 14th Street, while two more to the Brooklyn-bound platform lead to the southwestern corner. Each eastern entrance has an elevator between the platform and the street.

Art
The station contains two sets of mosaic artwork by Katherine Bradford. The eastern entrances include three large works collectively titled Queens of the Night, which depict figures in dancelike poses against a sapphire blue background. In addition, the First Avenue mezzanines contain two smaller works of flying superheroes, titled Superhero Responds. The mosaics cover  in total. When the artworks were commissioned, Bradford used the L train on her daily commute, passing through the First Avenue station.

Image gallery

Nearby points of interest
 Beth Israel Medical Center
 Stuyvesant High School Old Campus (High School for Health Professions and Human Services, Institute for Collaborative Education, and PS 226)
 Stuyvesant Square
 Stuyvesant Town

References

External links 

 
 Station Reporter — L Train
 The Subway Nut — 1st Avenue Pictures
 First Avenue entrance from Google Maps Street View
 Platforms from Google Maps Street View
 East end of platforms under construction for "Avenue A" entrance from Google Maps Street View

BMT Canarsie Line stations
New York City Subway stations in Manhattan
Railway stations in the United States opened in 1924
East Village, Manhattan
14th Street (Manhattan)